Alija Alijagić (20 November 1896 – 8 March 1922) was a Bosnian communist and assassin known for murdering Milorad Drašković, the Minister of the Interior of the Kingdom of Serbs, Croats and Slovenes.

The Communist Party of Yugoslavia condemned the act. Nevertheless, this inspired King Alexander to make a law concerning protection of the state that made the communist party illegal. The execution was carried out by Alois Seyfried.

References

1896 births
1922 deaths
People from Bijeljina
Bosniaks of Bosnia and Herzegovina
Bosnia and Herzegovina communists
Yugoslav assassins
People executed by Yugoslavia by hanging
Executed Bosnia and Herzegovina people
Executed assassins